The Town of Frederick is a Statutory Town located in Weld County, Colorado, United States. The town population was 14,513 at the 2020 United States Census, a +67.22% increase since the 2010 United States Census. Frederick is a part of the Greeley, CO Metropolitan Statistical Area and the Front Range Urban Corridor.

History
Initially named McKissick for the mine owner, Frederick was renamed when the daughters of Frederick A. Clark, a land owner, laid out the town site in 1907 and named it for their father. Incorporated in 1907, the Town of Frederick began as a coal mining town  attracting immigrants from Italy, France, Greece, Turkey, several Slavic countries and Latin America. The Frederick Coal mine closed in 1928.

In 2014 the town 're-branded' by designing a logo that is a stylized gas lamp with a mountain range background, and adopting the tag line "Built on What Matters". Prior to the re-branding the town primarily used the seal as a logo on town vehicles and letter head.

The town came to national media attention upon becoming the scene of a high-profile murder case in which resident Chris Watts killed his pregnant wife and their two daughters in August 2018.

Geography
Frederick is located at  (40.111175, −104.960967).

At the 2020 United States Census, the town had a total area of  including  of water.

Immediately adjacent communities to Frederick are Firestone to the North, and Dacono to the South. Frederick, Firestone, and Dacono generally being called the 'Tri-Towns' or the 'Tri-Town area', the area in general being called 'Carbon Valley'. The next closest communities are Erie to the southwest, Longmont to the west, Fort Lupton to the east, and an unincorporated area of Weld County called DelCamino to the northwest. Within the incorporated area of the Town of Frederick is an unincorporated section called 'Evanston'.

Demographics

As of the census of 2010, there were 8,709 people in 3070 households.  The racial makeup of the town was 7747 White, 47 African American, 181 Asian, 34 AIAN, 1 NHPI, 398 Other, with 1222 claiming Hispanic or Latino Ethnicity.  4369 were Male, 4310 were Female and 2692 under 18 years of age. 

As of the census of 2000, there were 2,467 people, 852 households, and 684 families residing in the town. The racial makeup of the town was 87.15% White, 0.57% African American, 1.01% Native American, 0.81% Asian, 8.07% from other races, and 2.39% from two or more races. Hispanic or Latino of any race were 20.88% of the population.

There were 852 households, out of which 43.7% had children under the age of 18 living with them, 68.9% were married couples living together, 7.2% had a female householder with no husband present, and 19.7% were non-families. 13.5% of all households were made up of individuals, and 2.8% had someone living alone who was 65 years of age or older.  The average household size was 2.90 and the average family size was 3.21.

In the town, the population was spread out, with 30.3% under the age of 18, 7.7% from 18 to 24, 38.2% from 25 to 44, 18.9% from 45 to 64, and 4.9% who were 65 years of age or older.  The median age was 31 years. For every 100 females, there were 100.1 males.  For every 100 females age 18 and over, there were 102.1 males.

The median income for a household in the town was $55,324, and the median income for a family was $56,394. Males had a median income of $39,191 versus $28,462 for females. The per capita income for the town was $20,602.  About 4.6% of families and 4.8% of the population were below the poverty line, including 6.8% of those under age 18 and 3.2% of those age 65 or over.

Education
Frederick Public Schools are part of the St. Vrain Valley School District. Schools located in Frederick include
Frederick Senior High School, Thunder Valley (K-8), Legacy Elementary, and Carbon Valley Academy (Charter School).

Politics
In 2017, Frederick residents voted in a recall election for the mayor and four of the town's trustees.  On Sep 5, 2017, the town announced that 1,984 ballots were cast, the most of any election in the history of the town. Majorities of voters cast ballots in favor of all of the officials keeping their seats, by margins of at least 300 votes in each case.

See also

Colorado
Bibliography of Colorado
Index of Colorado-related articles
Outline of Colorado
List of counties in Colorado
List of municipalities in Colorado
List of places in Colorado
List of statistical areas in Colorado
Front Range Urban Corridor
North Central Colorado Urban Area
Denver-Aurora, CO Combined Statistical Area
Greeley, CO Metropolitan Statistical Area

References

External links

Town of Frederick website
CDOT map of the Town of Frederick
Carbon Valley Edition of the Times-Call (Local news, information & advertising)

Towns in Weld County, Colorado
Towns in Colorado